Adolph Walter Samborski (February 10, 1904 – December 8, 1977) was an American coach and administrator who served as athletic director and head baseball coach at Harvard University.

Athletic career
Samborski attended Harvard after graduating from Westfield High School. He was captain of the freshman basketball team and the starting catcher on the freshman baseball team. He became a starting guard on the varsity basketball team his sophomore season and became the team captain as a junior. He was the backup varsity catcher his sophomore before taking over the starting job his junior year. He was also a fullback on the 1923 Harvard Crimson football team.

Coaching
Samborski graduated from Harvard College in 1925 and remained with the Crimson as freshman basketball coach while he earned master's degrees in education and European history. He also coached the Crimson's junior varsity baseball team and was the varsity baseball coach in 1947 and 1948. He gave up coaching in 1948 to focus on his job as director of intramural sports.

Administration
In 1927 Samborski presented Harvard with a plan for organized intramural sports. The plan was approved and he was named director of intramural sports. In 1961, Samborski became Harvard's assistant athletic director. In 1963 he was promoted to associate athletic director and took over as acting athletic director when Thomas Bolles retired on August 31, 1963. On March 10, 1964, he was given the job permanently. He retired in August 1970. From 1971 to 1974 he was the commissioner of the Yankee Conference. He died on December 8, 1977, in York, Maine after a long illness.

References

External links
 

1904 births
1977 deaths
American football fullbacks
Baseball catchers
Guards (basketball)
Harvard Crimson athletic directors
Harvard Crimson baseball coaches
Harvard Crimson baseball players
Harvard Crimson football players
Harvard Crimson men's basketball coaches
Harvard Crimson men's basketball players
Yankee Conference commissioners
People from Westfield, Massachusetts
People from York, Maine
Players of American football from Massachusetts
Baseball coaches from Massachusetts
Baseball players from Massachusetts
Basketball coaches from Massachusetts
Basketball players from Massachusetts